{{Infobox horseraces
|class         = Group 3
|horse race    = John Porter Stakes(Dubai Duty Free Finest Surprise Stakes)
|image         =
|caption       =
|location      = Newbury RacecourseNewbury, England
|inaugurated   = 1928
|race type     = Flat / Thoroughbred
|sponsor       = Dubai Duty Free
|website       = Newbury
|distance      = 1m 4f (2,414 m)
|surface       = Turf
|track         = Left-handed
|qualification = Four-years-old and up
|weight        = 9 st 0 lbAllowances3 lb for fillies and maresPenalties7 lb for Group 1 winners *5 lb for Group 2 winners *3 lb for Group 3 winners **since 31 August last year|purse         = £45,000 (2021)1st: £25,520
}}

|}

The John Porter Stakes is a Group 3 flat horse race in Great Britain open to horses aged four years or older. It is run over a distance of 1 mile, 4 furlongs at Newbury in April.

History
The event is named after John Porter (1838–1922), a successful horse trainer who co-founded Newbury Racecourse.

The race was established in 1928, and it was originally held in late September. It was initially restricted to three-year-olds and run over 1 mile and 5 furlongs. It was opened to four-year-olds in 1929, and cut to 1¼ miles in 1936.

The present version of the John Porter Stakes was introduced in 1949. From this point it was staged in April, and contested by older horses over 1½ miles.

The John Porter Stakes is currently sponsored by Dubai Duty Free. Its sponsored title promotes the company's Finest Surprise lottery.

Records

Most successful horse:
 no horse has won this race more than onceLeading jockey (5 wins):
 Pat Eddery – Rock Hopper (1991), Saddlers' Hall (1992), Right Win (1994), Sadian (1999), Lucido (2001)Leading trainer (7 wins):
 Sir Michael Stoute – Rock Hopper (1991), Saddlers' Hall (1992), Whitewater Affair (1997), Maraahel (2007), Harbinger (2010), Arab Spring (2015), Dartmouth (2016)Winners since 1970

Earlier winners

 1928: Ox and Ass
 1929: Silver Hussar
 1930: Wedding Favour
 1931: Birthday Book
 1932: Corn Belt
 1933: Sarum
 1934: Felicitation
 1935: Night Owl
 1936: St Botolph
 1937: Haulfryn
 1938: Fair Copy
 1939–40: no race 1941: Ruscus
 1942–48: no race 1949: Solar Slipper
 1950: Native Heath
 1951: no race 1952: Neron
 1953: Wilwyn
 1954: Harwin
 1955: Entente Cordiale
 1956: Acropolis
 1957: China Rock
 1958: Doutelle
 1959: Cutter
 1960: Aggressor
 1961: High Perch
 1962: Hot Brandy
 1963: Peter Jones
 1964: Royal Avenue
 1965: Soderini
 1966: no race 1967: Charlottown
 1968: Fortissimo
 1969: Crozier

See also
 Horse racing in Great Britain
 List of British flat horse races

References

 
 Paris-Turf:
 Racing Post:

 galopp-sieger.de – John Porter Stakes. ifaonline.org – International Federation of Horseracing Authorities – John Porter Stakes (2019). pedigreequery.com – John Porter Stakes – Newbury.''
 

Open middle distance horse races
Newbury Racecourse
Flat races in Great Britain
1928 establishments in England
Recurring sporting events established in 1928